The Fatehpuri Mosque is a 17th-century mosque in India located at the western end of the oldest street of Chandni Chowk, in the Old Delhi neighbourhood of Delhi, India. It is opposite the Red Fort on the opposite end of Chandni Chowk.

History
Fatehpuri Masjid was built in 1650 by Fatehpuri Begum, one of emperor Shah Jahan's wives who was from Fatehpur Sikri, and the mosque at Taj Mahal is also named after her.

The British had auctioned the mosque after the 1857 war to Rai Lala Chunnamal for Rs. 19,000(whose descendants still live in the Chunnamal haveli in Chandni Chowk), who preserved the mosque. Later in 1877 it was acquired by the government in exchange for four villages and was restored to the Muslims at the Delhi Durbar when the British allowed the Muslims back in Old Delhi. A similar mosque, called Akbarabadi Mosque built by the Akbarabadi Begum was destroyed by the British.

The Khari Baoli, which is today Asia's largest spice market, gradually developed after the construction of the mosque.

Muslim festivals Id-ul-Fitr and Id-ul-Zuha are celebrated with great enthusiasm at the mosque. Mufti Mukarram Ahmad is the chief mufti and hereditary imam of the mosque and has been Imam there for almost 42 years and before him his father Maulana Mufti Mohammad Ahmad (d. 21 October 1971/1391 AH) was imam and mufti of the mosque.

The grave of the wife of rebel leader Maulana Abdul Qadir Ludhianvi is located in the courtyard of the Fatehpuri Mosque.

Architecture 

The mosque is built using red sandstone and has a fluted dome with mahapadma and kalash on the top. Flanked by minarets, the mosque has a traditional design with the prayer hall having seven-arched openings. The mosque has single and double-storeyed apartments on the sides.

The central iwan in the middle is flanked by three arches on each side.

See also
 Jama Masjid, Delhi
 Mukarram Ahmad

References

External links 

Mosques in Delhi
Mughal mosques
Religious buildings and structures completed in 1650
1650 establishments in the Mughal Empire